In the 1955–56 season, USM Blida competed in the Division Honneur for the 23rd season French colonial era, as well as the Forconi Cup. They competed in Division Honneur, and the Forconi Cup.

Competitions

Overview

Division Honneur

League table

Results by round

Matches

Forconi Cup

North African Cup

Squad information

Playing statistics

Goalscorers

References

External links
 L'Echo d'Alger : journal républicain du matin
 La Dépêche quotidienne : journal républicain du matin
 Alger républicain : journal républicain du matin
 L'Écho d'Oran (Oran)

USM Blida seasons
Algerian football clubs 1955–56 season